The Delta Mountains or Delta Range are a subrange of the Alaska Range, forming its eastern terminus.

The Delta River originates on the south side of the range, near Paxson, and flows north through the mountains (between the Delta Mountains and the Hayes Range, to the west) to join the Tanana River. It has been designated a National Wild and Scenic River since 1980.

References

Alaska Range
Landforms of Southeast Fairbanks Census Area, Alaska
Mountains of Unorganized Borough, Alaska